A total solar eclipse occurred on May 28, 1900. A solar eclipse occurs when the Moon passes between Earth and the Sun, thereby totally or partly obscuring the image of the Sun for a viewer on Earth. A total solar eclipse occurs when the Moon's apparent diameter is larger than the Sun's, blocking all direct sunlight, turning day into darkness. Totality occurs in a narrow path across Earth's surface, with the partial solar eclipse visible over a surrounding region thousands of kilometres wide.

Viewing 

In 1900 the Smithsonian Astrophysical Observatory, then based in Washington, D.C., loaded several railroad cars with scientific equipment and headed to Wadesboro, North Carolina. Scientists had determined that this small town would be the best location in North America for viewing the total solar eclipse, and the Smithsonian Solar Eclipse Expedition hoped to capture photographic images of the solar corona during the event for further study. The team included Thomas Smillie, the mission's photographer. Smillie rigged cameras to seven telescopes and successfully made eight glass-plate negatives, ranging in size from eleven by fourteen inches to thirty by thirty inches. Smillie's work was considered an amazing photographic and scientific achievement.

In addition to the team from the Smithsonian:

[s]cientific expeditions were mounted from some of the world’s preeminent astronomy programs including Princeton University, the University of Chicago, . . . and the British Astronomical Association. S. P. Langley and C. A. Young, two of the founders of modern astronomy, were also there.

According to Wadesboro's newspaper, the Anson Independent, the public came out in droves. Extra trains—including a special excursion train from Charlotte—brought out hundreds of people, and by the time the eclipse’s effects were beginning to be seen around 7:30 a.m., the streets were packed, and people were vying for better spots from rooftops and windows..

The same local newspaper described the total eclipse itself as lasting for less than a minute and a half, and recorded that though a large crowd was on hand, it was nearly silent during that entire time. The paper also mentioned that the drop in temperature from the shadow caused by the eclipse was quite significant.
The eclipse was filmed by Nevil Maskelyne in North Carolina. It was also observed from Mahelma in Algeria by John Evershed.

Next Solar Eclipses in Central Europe (120° east of USA) 
 February 15, 1961
 August 11, 1999

Related eclipses

Solar eclipses of 1898–1902

Saros 126

Notes

References
 
 NASA graphic
 Googlemap
 NASA Besselian elements
 Photos and sketches of the Solar Corona May 28, 1900
 The Total Solar Eclipse, 1900 Report of the expeditions organized by the British Astronomical Association to observe the total solar eclipse of 1900, May 28, A Publication of the British Astronomical Association, Chapter VII: "Elche" (Spain), by Mr. E. W. Johnson
 Total Eclipses of the Sun, By Mabel Loomis Todd, 1894, new and revised edition by David Peck Todd, 1900.
 Lewis E. Jewell et al. "Reports concerning the total solar eclipse of May 28, 1900 and of May 17, 1901”, Publications of the U.S. Naval Observatory 4 (1906) app. 1, 94–97, 121–151, 203–215, 299–307 and pl. LXXII.
 Russia expedition for solar eclipse of May 28, 1900
 

1900 05 28
1900 in science
1900 05 28
May 1900 events